Olonetsky (masculine), Olonetskaya (feminine), or Olonetskoye (neuter) may refer to:
Olonetsky District, a district of the Republic of Karelia, Russia
Olonetskoye Urban Settlement, a municipal formation incorporating the town of Olonets and eight rural localities in Olonetsky District of the Republic of Karelia, Russia
Olonets Governorate (Olonetskaya guberniya), a governorate of the Russian Empire
Olonets Viceroyalty (Olonetskoye namestnichestvo), a viceroyalty of the Russian Empire bordering Vologda Viceroyalty
Olonets Oblast (Olonetskaya oblast), a division of the Russian Empire, originally in Novgorod Viceroyalty